Monument Ave., originally titled Snitch in the United States and titled Noose in Australia, is a 1998 American neo-noir crime film directed by Ted Demme and starring Denis Leary. The film also stars Famke Janssen, Martin Sheen, Ian Hart, and Lenny Clarke. Cam Neely also makes a brief appearance as a man returning home from work who finds his house has been broken into. The film takes place in Charlestown, Massachusetts and centers on small-time criminal Bobby O'Grady (Leary), who becomes conflicted due to Charlestown's code of silence. His loyalty and drive for self-preservation are tested, after two of his close family members (also criminals) are gunned down by their boss.

Plot summary
Bobby mentors his young cousin, Seamus (Jason Barry), into a life of drugs and crime soon after Seamus emigrates from Dublin, Ireland. Bright, conscientious, but notably naive, Seamus finds himself unable to get used to the spontaneous dangers and recklessness of his new life in the United States.

Seamus commits a hate crime on an African American youth who had crossed the racial boundary around Charlestown in the 1990s. Following this and another particularly traumatic incident, Seamus is afraid of further involving himself with Bobby and Bobby's circle of criminal friends. Seamus tells Bobby he wants to return to Dublin.

The two argue after Seamus blames Bobby for dragging him into a dangerous and "damaging" lifestyle which he never wanted. Seamus is killed soon afterward by crime boss Jackie O'Hara (Colm Meaney). O'Hara mistakenly believes that Seamus told police about O'Hara's criminal operations. O'Hara had ordered an earlier hit against Bobby and Seamus' cousin Teddy (Billy Crudup), because Teddy had made a deal with police. The deal concerned a reduced prison sentence.

Cast
 Denis Leary ... Bobby O'Grady
 Colm Meaney ... Jackie O'Hara
 Famke Janssen ... Katy O'Connor 
 Martin Sheen ... Hanlon
 Billy Crudup ... Teddy
 Ian Hart ... Mouse
 Lyndon Byers ... Fitzie
 Melissa Fitzgerald ... Sheila
 Jason Barry ... Seamus
 John Diehl ... Digger
 Greg Dulli ... Shang
 Jeanne Tripplehorn ... Annie

Reception
On Rotten Tomatoes the film has an approval rating of 90% based on reviews from 21 critics.

References

External links 
 
 

1998 films
1998 crime drama films
American crime drama films
1990s English-language films
Films about organized crime in the United States
Films set in Boston
Films about Irish-American culture
Films about immigration to the United States
Films set in Massachusetts
Films shot in Massachusetts
Films directed by Ted Demme
The Kushner-Locke Company films
American neo-noir films
1990s American films